4-HO-pyr-T (4-hydroxy-N,N-tetramethylenetryptamine) is a lesser-known psychedelic drug.  It is the 4-hydroxyl analog of pyr-T. 4-HO-pyr-T was first synthesized by Alexander Shulgin. In his book TiHKAL (Tryptamines I Have Known and Loved), neither the dosage nor the duration are reported. 4-HO-pyr-T produces few to no effects. Very little data exists about the pharmacological properties, metabolism, and toxicity of 4-HO-pyr-T.

References

Tryptamines
Pyrrolidines